Laires is a commune in the Pas-de-Calais department in the Hauts-de-France region of France.

Geography
It is surrounded by the communes Beaumetz-lès-Aire, Prédefin and Fléchin.

Population

History
In 734, Laires was called "Wilbert", after its owner. The spelling of the name has changed over the centuries from Larae, Laris, Lares, Laire and Lare, to become Laires by the eighteenth century. In 1115, Baldwin VII, Count of Flanders, made a gift of the village to the abbey of St Saviour at Ham. In January 1478, a band of soldiers from the Burgundian garrison at Renescure terrorized the area around Laires. Instead of helping people to fight the "French enemy" they looted the village. Against the Spanish, the commune suffered again. In 1537 the area was completely devastated. In 1542 and 1543, the village was looted several times and fourteen French houses were burned down.

Places of interest
 The church of St.Martin, dating from the fifteenth century.
 The war memorial, from 1921.

See also
Communes of the Pas-de-Calais department

References

Communes of Pas-de-Calais